Tihomir of Raška was a Serbian nobleman, mentioned in the Chronicle of the Priest of Duklja, who served as the Grand Prince of Raška, from around 960 to 969.

Background
Tihomir's predecessor Časlav (r. 927–960) had united several Slavic tribes, expanding Serbia which then extended between the shores of the Adriatic Sea, the Sava river and the Morava valley.
The Magyars led by Kisa invaded Bosnia. The Serbian army advanced and met them on the banks of river Drina, in the Drina župania, downstream from present-day Foča.
The Magyars were decisively defeated, and Kisa was killed by Tihomir.
Due to his heroism, Časlav appointed Tihomir Duke of Drina and gave him his daughter in marriage.

Succession to Raška

Kisa's widow asked the Magyar leaders to give her an army for revenge.
With an "unknown number" of troops, the widow returned and surprised Časlav at Syrmia. 
The Magyars attack the Serbs in the night, capturing Časlav and all of his male relatives.
On the command of Kisa's widow, all the prisoners were bound by their hands and feet and thrown into the Sava river.
This event is dated to around 960 or thereafter, as 'De Administrando Imperio' does not mention his death.

Through his marriage with Časlav's daughter, Tihomir inherited the crownland of Raška.

Later annexation of Raška by Byzantium

Tihomir's reign ended around 969. The Catepanate of Ras was established between 971–976, during the rule of John Tzimiskes (r. 969–976). A seal of a strategos of Ras has been dated to Tzimiskes' reign, making it possible for Tzimiskes' predecessor Nikephoros II Phokas to have established rule over Raška.
The protospatharios and katepano of Ras was a Byzantine governor named John.
Data on the katepano of Ras during Tzimiskes' reign is missing.
Byzantine military presence ended soon thereafter with the wars with Bulgaria, and was re-established only ca. 1018 with the short-lived Theme of Sirmium, which however did not extend much into Raška.

See also
Byzantine Serbia
List of Serbian monarchs

Footnotes

References

Sources
Primary
 
 
 
 

Secondary

 
  
 
 
 
 
 Ferjančić, B. 1997, "Basile I et la restauration du pouvoir byzantin au IXème siècle", Zbornik radova Vizantološkog instituta, no. 36, pp. 9–30.
 
 
  
 
 
 
 
 
  

10th-century Serbian nobility
10th-century rulers in Europe
Medieval Serbian military leaders
Vlastimirović dynasty
Year of birth unknown
Year of death unknown